Eklavya Rakesh Dwivedi (born 22 July 1988) is an Indian cricketer. He is a wicketkeeper who plays in the Indian domestic cricket for Uttar Pradesh. He had been a member of the Pune Warriors India squad between 2011 and 2013. He was a member of the Chennai Super Kings squad in 2015 as a reserve wicket-keeper to MS Dhoni and Brendon McCullum.

Dwiwedi was bought by sunrisers Hyderabad for Rs 75 Lacs after he scored 258 runs in nine matches at 51.60 in 2015-16 Syed Mushtaq Ali Trophy.

References

External links

1988 births
Living people
Indian cricketers
Uttar Pradesh cricketers
Chennai Super Kings cricketers
Pune Warriors India cricketers
Gujarat Lions cricketers
Wicket-keepers